This is a list of United States–based companies having the most employees globally. Note that for some companies listed, the majority of total employees live and work in other countries.

Employees are mixed and composed of various Economic sectors such as the Business sector, Private sector, Public sector, and the Voluntary sector. Additional classifications include the Agricultural (or primary) sector, Industrial (or secondary) sector, Service (or tertiary) sector, Information (or quaternary) sector, and Human (or quinary) sector.

Employment by company

Employment by major industry sector
According to research from the Federal Reserve Economic Data (more specifically, provided by the Bureau of Labor Statistics), health care has now surpassed both manufacturing and retail as the engine for employment growth in the coming decades. There were approximately 16 million people employed in the health care sector in 2017.

See also

 List of companies of the United States by state
 List of largest companies in the United States by revenue
 List of largest employers
 List of multinational corporations
 List of wealthiest religious organizations
 List of largest corporate profits and losses
 List of public corporations by market capitalization
 List of most valuable brands
 List of countries by GDP sector composition
 List of companies by research and development spending
 List of largest private non-governmental companies by revenue
 List of the largest software companies
 List of largest Internet companies
 List of largest companies by revenue
 List of largest technology companies by revenue
 List of largest manufacturing companies by revenue
 List of largest financial services companies by revenue
 List of largest automotive companies by revenue
 List of largest oil and gas companies by revenue
 List of private-equity firms
 Lists of companies 
 Lists of occupations
 List of types of tradesman
 Fortune Global 500
 Forbes Global 2000
 List of DJIA companies
 NASDAQ Financial-100
 List of S&P 500 companies
 List of S&P 400 companies
 Economy of the United States
 List of economic expansions in the United States 
 List of recessions in the United States
 Unemployment in the United States
 Technological unemployment

References

Largest employers
Employers